Federal elections were held in West Germany on 19 September 1965 to elect the members of the 5th Bundestag.  The CDU/CSU remained the largest faction, while the Social Democratic Party remained the largest single party in the Bundestag, winning 217 of the 518 seats (including 15 of the 22 non-voting delegates for West Berlin).

Campaign
Federal Chancellor Ludwig Erhard was initially popular as the acclaimed "father" of West Germany's economic miracle of the 1950s and early 1960s.  West Germany's economy still seemed solid in 1965, and thus not enough West German voters wanted to change the party of Federal Chancellor.  To ensure his victory in this Bundestag election, Erhard promised to cut income tax and to increase social program spending.

Results

Results by state

Constituency seats

List seats

Aftermath 
The coalition between the CDU/CSU and the FDP returned to government, with Ludwig Erhard as Chancellor. In 1966, the FDP left the coalition over budget issues, and Erhard resigned. Kurt Georg Kiesinger (also CDU) formed a new grand coalition between the CDU/CSU and the SPD which lasted until the next election.

Notes

References

Federal elections in Germany
1965 elections in Germany
Ludwig Erhard
1965 in West Germany
September 1965 events in Europe